The Budapest Opera Ball (Budapesti Operabál in Hungarian, Budapester Opernball in German) is an annual Hungarian society event taking place in the building of the Budapest Opera (Operaház) on the last Saturday of the carnival season, usually late February. On this occasion the stage and the auditorium of the Opera is transformed into a huge ballroom. The dress code is evening dress: white tie and tailcoat for men, floor-length gowns for women. The ball is opened by more than a hundred debutante dancers after a show consisting of selected arias, followed by the Alles Walzer with people dancing until dawn.  Recent international guests include Montserrat Caballé, Ornella Muti, Yevgeny Nesterenko, Walter Berry, Heinz Zednik, Katia Ricciarelli, Patrizio Buanne, Catherine Deneuve, Katarina Witt, Gina Lollobrigida, Daryl Hannah, and Guy de Rothschild.  Besides such guests as these, the balls are highlighted by the best-known Hungarian opera singers.

The Opera Ball was first organised on March 2, 1886. Suspended in 1934, it was not revived until 1996.  Representing a tradition rooted in Austrian-Hungarian culture of the 1880s, the revival has become the most prestigious meeting point of the participants of the Hungarian public life, fully covered by national media.

In 2011, a charity Gala Concert was substituted for the Opera Ball with as a gesture "of contribution to the work of the Government, the leading institutions and the citizens" to help those Hungarians afflicted by the ongoing financial crisis and the various natural disasters.

See also

 Opernball (disambiguation)

Recurring events established in 1886
Culture in Budapest
Balls (dance party)
Debutante balls
Festivals in Hungary
1886 establishments in Austria-Hungary